The 2020 Judo Grand Slam Hungary was held at the László Papp Budapest Sports Arena in Budapest, Hungary from 23 to 25 October 2020.

Medal summary

Men's events

Source Results

Women's events

Source Results

Medal table

References

External links
 

2020 IJF World Tour
2020 Judo Grand Slam
Judo
Grand Slam 2020
Judo
Judo
Judo